Exchange Bank or Exchange Bank Building may refer to:

Exchange Bank (El Dorado, Arkansas), a National Register of Historic Places (NRHP) listing in Union County, Arkansas
Exchange Bank Building (Little Rock, Arkansas)
Exchange Bank Building (Tallahassee, Florida)
Genesee Exchange Bank, Genesee, Idaho
Meridian Exchange Bank, an NRHP listing in Ada County, Idaho
Exchange Bank (Golden, Illinois)
Exchange Bank Building (Farmington, Minnesota)
Smithfield Exchange Bank, Smithfield, Rhode Island

See also
Davis-Exchange Bank Building, an NRHP listing in Dougherty County, Georgia
Stock Exchange Bank, an NRHP listing in Ellis County, Oklahoma
Farmers' and Exchange Bank, Charleston, South Carolina
National Loan and Exchange Bank Building, an NRHP listing in Columbia, South Carolina
American Exchange Bank, Madison, Wisconsin, an NRHP listing in Dane County, Wisconsin